Asbhar-e Sofla (also Romanized as Asbhār-e Soflá; also known as Asbhār-e Pā’īn and Asbhār-e Qeshlāq-e Pā’īn) is a village in Qeshlaq Rural District, Abish Ahmad District, Kaleybar County, East Azerbaijan Province, Iran. At the 2006 census, its population was 67, in 14 families.

References 

Populated places in Kaleybar County